Janet Ray Michie, Baroness Michie of Gallanach (née Bannerman; 4 February 1934 – 6 May 2008) was a Scottish speech therapist and Liberal Democrat politician. She served as Member of Parliament (MP) for Argyll and Bute for 14 years, from 1987 to 2001, and then became a life peer in the House of Lords. She was the first peer to pledge the oath of allegiance in the House of Lords in Gaelic.

Early life
Janet Ray Bannerman was born in the Old Manse, Balmaha, on the eastern shore of Loch Lomond in Stirlingshire, the second of the four children of Jenny Murray (Ray) (née Mundell) and John Bannerman (later Lord Bannerman of Kildonan).

Her father was a farm manager to the Duke of Montrose, a former Scotland rugby player and Liberal politician. In her youth, she spoke at political meetings while waiting for her father to arrive. He fought Argyll at the 1945 general election, and Inverness at the 1950 general election. He surprised many by narrowly losing the 1954 Inverness by-election, coming close again at the general elections in 1951 and 1955. He fought, and narrowly lost, the 1961 Paisley by-election, and fought Paisley again at the 1964 general election, before becoming a life peer in December 1967.

Michie was educated at Aberdeen High School for Girls, Lansdowne House School (Edinburgh), and the Edinburgh College of Speech Therapy. She married Iain Michie in 1957, and she followed his work with the Royal Army Medical Corps for 16 years in the UK and overseas. They had three daughters. She continued as a speech therapist after they settled in Oban, working at the county hospital and becoming Area Speech Therapist for the Argyll and Clyde Health Board in 1977.

Political career
Following in the footsteps of her father, she entered politics and became Chairman of Argyll Liberal Association from 1973 to 1976, and then vice-Chairman of the Scottish Liberal Party from 1977 to 1979. She stood as Liberal candidate for Argyll and Bute three times, losing in 1979 and 1983, but ultimately defeating Conservative minister John Mackay to secure election as Member of Parliament at the 1987 general election, becoming the Liberals' only female MP.

She took the oath of allegiance in the House of Commons in Gaelic, and joined the Liberal Democrats on the party's formation in 1988. She increased her majority in the next two general elections, gaining the confidence of the voters in her scattered constituency of peninsulas and islands. 

She was a Liberal Democrat spokesman on transport and rural development from 1987 to 1988, on women's issues from 1988 to 1994, and on Scotland from 1988 to 1997. She was an advocate of home rule for Scotland and the promotion of and development of the Scottish Gaelic language. She was also chair of the Scottish Liberal Democrats from 1992 to 1993. She was appointed a member of the panel of chairmen by Speaker Betty Boothroyd in her last term in the Commons, from 1997 to 2001. She supported the campaigns to end submarine operations of the Royal Navy and United States Navy in the Firth of Clyde, to hold another inquiry into the Chinook crash on the Mull of Kintyre in 1994, and the successful bid for the residents of Gigha to buy their own island.

In 1992 Ray Michie became a member of the House of Commons Select Committee on Scottish Affairs. Later, she also became a joint Vice-Chairperson of the Parliamentary Group on the Whisky Industry. She stood down from Parliament at the 2001 general election, being replaced by Alan Reid. She was made a life peer as Baroness Michie of Gallanach, of Oban in Argyll and Bute on 14 July 2001. She was the first peer to pledge the oath of allegiance in Gaelic when being introduced to the Lords.

At different points in her career, she was Vice-President of the Royal College of Speech and Language Therapists, Honorary Associate of the National Council of Women of Great Britain, and Honorary President of the Clyde Fishermen's Association, and also held honorary positions in the An Comunn Gàidhealach, the Scottish National Farmers' Union and the Scottish Crofting Foundation, and was a participant in the early days of the Scottish Constitutional Convention. She chaired the West Highland Health Services Solutions Group.

In August 2007 she was appointed to the Scottish Broadcasting Commission established by the Scottish Government. Before the Commission was able to report Michie died at her home in Oban after receiving treatment for cancer. She died two days after her Liberal Democrat colleague  in the House of Lords, Richard Holme. She was survived by two daughters, having been predeceased by her husband and a third daughter.

References

Obituaries:
The Daily Telegraph, 9 May 2008
The Guardian, 9 May 2008
 The Independent, 9 May 2008
The Times, 9 May 2008

External links
Baroness Michie of Gallanach profile at the site of Liberal Democrats(page not found)
 

1934 births
2008 deaths
Female members of the Parliament of the United Kingdom for Scottish constituencies
Life peeresses created by Elizabeth II
Scottish Liberal Party MPs
Scottish Liberal Democrat MPs
Michie of Gallanach
UK MPs 1987–1992
UK MPs 1992–1997
UK MPs 1997–2001
Daughters of life peers
Deaths from cancer in Scotland
People educated at Harlaw Academy
People from Oban
People from Stirling (council area)
20th-century Scottish women politicians
20th-century Scottish politicians
21st-century Scottish women politicians
21st-century Scottish politicians
National Council of Women of Great Britain members
Michie